The Atlantic mackerel (Scomber scombrus), also known as Boston mackerel, Norwegian mackerel, Scottish mackerel or just mackerel, is a species of mackerel found in the temperate waters of the Mediterranean Sea, the Black Sea, and the northern Atlantic Ocean, where it is extremely common and occurs in huge shoals in the epipelagic zone down to about . It spends the warmer months close to shore and near the ocean surface, appearing along the coast in spring and departing with the arrival of colder weather in the fall and winter months. During the fall and winter, it migrates out into deeper and more southern water, seeking warmer temperatures.

The Atlantic mackerel's body is elongate, steel-blue marked with wavy black lines dorsally and silvery-white ventrally, its snout long and pointed. It possesses two spiny dorsal fins, which are spaced far apart, two pectoral fins, and small caudal and anal fins, also spaced far apart. 4-6 dorsal finlets and 5 anal finlets are typical among members of this species. The fish's body tapers down its length, ending with a large tail fin. Reproduction, which is oviparous, occurs near the shore in the spring and summer, during which a female can produce as many as 450,000 eggs. Juveniles reach sexual maturity at around 2 years of age and can live to be 17.

A highly commercial species, the Atlantic mackerel is sought after for its meat, which is strong in flavor and high in oil content and omega-3 fatty acids among other nutrients. Nearly 1 million tonnes of Atlantic mackerel are caught each year globally, the bulk of which is sold fresh, frozen, smoked, or canned. Despite its highly commercial status, the Atlantic mackerel is listed as Least Concern by the International Union for Conservation of Nature (IUCN) and global catch has remained sustainable.

Taxonomy and phylogeny
The Atlantic mackerel was first described in 1758 by Swedish zoologist Carl Linnaeus in his 10th edition of Systema Naturae. Linnaeus gave it the scientific name Scomber scomber from the Greek word skombros meaning "tunny" or "mackerel". Because of its wide distribution, the Atlantic mackerel was independently described 6 more times by 5 different scientists between 1814 and 1863. Its specific name was later changed to scombrus by B. B. Collette and C. E. Nauen in 1983. It is differentiated from its congeners in a number of ways, the first being the absence of a swim bladder. Its palatine bone is also wider than other members of its genus and its otolith is oval-shaped where its congeners' are rectangular.

In the eastern Atlantic Ocean there are three stocks differentiated by location and time at which spawning occurs, but studies have not found any distinct genetic differences between these populations. Genetic differences only start to appear at the transatlantic scale, a fact supported by a lack of migration between western and eastern Atlantic populations, whereas eastern Atlantic stocks are known to converge in certain locations like the Norwegian Sea and North Sea.

Description

The Atlantic mackerel has an elongate, fusiform body with a long, pointed snout. The eyes are large and covered by an adipose eyelid, while the teeth are small, sharp, and conical. Scales are also small, with the exceptions of those immediately posterior to the head and around the pectoral fins. These small scales give the Atlantic mackerel a velvet-like feel. The two dorsal fins are large and spaced far apart. The second dorsal fin is typically followed by 5 dorsal finlets, though it can have 4 or 6. The anal fin, which originates slightly behind the second dorsal fin, is similar to it in size and shape and is also succeeded by 5 finlets. The fish's body tapers to a slim caudal peduncle, the end of the fish to which the short but broad tail fin is attached. Its body is steel-blue dorsally with wavy black lines running perpendicular to the fish's length. The rest of its body is silvery-white to yellow and may have darker splotches.

Distribution and habitat
The Atlantic mackerel's native range in the western Atlantic extends from Labrador, Canada to Cape Lookout, North Carolina. In the eastern Atlantic, it can be found from Iceland and Norway to as far south as Mauritania. It is also found in the Mediterranean, Black, and Baltic Seas.

Atlantic mackerel are migratory fish, spending the spring and summer closer to shore about  out, with juveniles moving closer in to shore than adults. Occasionally, fish will even enter harbors, and those that do are usually juveniles. In the fall and winter they move farther out and farther south to the warmer waters on the edge of the continental shelf. They first come in to land in North America in April at the southern end of their range, but are found along the coast through their entire range by July. They start moving back out to sea again in September and are completely gone from the coast by December. Food availability increases greatly during the summer, and fish reach a peak for fat tissue in August, a mere four months after their lowest point in April.

Biology and ecology
The Atlantic mackerel is an active, fast-moving fish that must keep in constant motion to bring in enough oxygen to survive. It swims using short movements of the rear of its body and the caudal fin. Unlike other mackerel, Atlantic mackerel do not leap out of the water unless attempting to escape a predator. They form large schools, consisting of individuals of the same relative size, near the ocean surface during all seasons but winter. Because larger fish have a greater ratio of muscle mass to surface area, schools of larger fish are able to swim more quickly than schools made up of smaller individuals.

Feeding
When feeding on larger prey, schools tend to break down into shoals and individuals find food on their own. When consuming plankton, however, Atlantic mackerel form tight aggregations, open their mouths as wide as possible, and extend their operculums, swimming in a tightly packed school that acts like a series of miniature tow nets. Spaced only about the diameter of a single fish's mouth apart, this formation greatly reduces the ability of plankton to evade capture, as a plankton darting out of the way of one fish is likely to end up in the jaws of another. Copepods make up the majority of the Atlantic mackerel's diet, Calanus finmarchicus being the most abundant.

Life history
Like other mackerels, reproduction in the Atlantic mackerel is oviparous. A single female can spawn as many as 450,000 eggs in a spawning season. Eggs mature in batches over the course of a week and are pelagic once released, remaining within  of the surface. Most eggs are spawned in waters  in temperature, and as such the majority of eggs hatch in about a week. Larvae undergo three developmental stages: the yolk sac stage, the larval stage, and the post-larval stage. Larvae are  when they hatch and feed on the yolk sac for about 5 days. They are largely incapable of swimming, instead floating with the current. During the post-larval stage, which occurs over the next 40 days and during which the fish reaches  in length, it swims to the surface at night and down to deeper waters during the day. At the end of the post-larval stage, juveniles resemble an adult mackerel in all but size. Schooling behavior occurs around this time.

Sexual maturity is reached at around 2 years of age, though some fish may reproduce a season earlier or a season later. At , 90% of fish are capable of reproduction.

Human interaction

The Atlantic mackerel is of commercial importance to many Atlantic fisheries, which catch it with purse seines, trawls, gill and trammel nets, and trolling lines. Global annual catch is typically in the range of 1 million tonnes, though a 50% spike in 2014 put this number at nearly 1.5 million tonnes. The United Kingdom and Norway bring in the most Atlantic mackerel, with annual catches coming in at over 166,000 tonnes and 160,000 tonnes respectively. There are three stocks in the eastern Atlantic: one in the south, one in the west, and another in the North Sea. There are two populations in the Mediterranean, one in the east and one in the west. In the western Atlantic there are two stocks, one in the north and one in the south, for which assessments are, according to the IUCN, "highly uncertain".

As food

Atlantic mackerel outer meat is red meat while inner meat is white, with a strong taste desirable to some consumers. They are sold fresh, frozen, smoked, salted, filleted, or as steaks. The fish is extremely high in oil content, vitamin B, vitamin B, selenium, niacin, and omega 3, a class of fatty acids, containing nearly twice as much of the latter per unit weight as salmon. Unlike the King and Spanish species, Northern Atlantic mackerel are very low in mercury, and can be eaten at least twice a week according to United States Environmental Protection Agency guidelines.

Conservation
Despite its commercial status, the Atlantic mackerel was assessed to be of Least Concern by the IUCN in 2011. Its abundance and extensive range combined with a cyclical increase/decrease in catch mean that it is not currently in danger of going extinct. The IUCN did recommend careful monitoring, however, especially as the effects of climate change may impact population size and distribution. In the northeastern Atlantic, several countries impose minimum landing sizes.

Symbol
The Spanish word for mackerel is a colloquial demonym for the people of Ceuta, Spain.

References

Further reading

External links
 
 
 EDF Report on Mackerel – Atlantic Mackerel conservation and contamination report

Atlantic mackerel
Smoked fish
Cold water fish
Fish of the North Atlantic
Atlantic mackerel
Atlantic mackerel